A home page is the main web page of a website. The term also refers to one or more pages always shown in a web browser when the application starts up.

Home Page or home page may also refer to:
 A web server directory index 
 Personal web page, a web page (or a whole site) created by an individual with content of a personal nature
 Home Page (film), a 1999 documentary on weblogs
 Home Page (TV series), a Canadian television show
 IBM Home Page Reader, a computer program
 Women's page of a newspaper

See also 
 Front page (disambiguation)